Dimefox was an organophosphate pesticide. In its pure form it is a colourless  liquid with a fishy odour. Dimefox was first produced in 1940 by the group of Gerhard Schrader in Germany. It was historically used as a pesticide, but has been deemed obsolete or discontinued for use by the World Health Organization  It is not guaranteed that all commercial use of this compound ceased, but in most countries it is no longer registered for use as a pesticide. It is considered an extremely hazardous substance as defined by the United States Emergency Planning and Community Right-to-Know Act.

See also
Mipafox
Schradan

References

Obsolete pesticides
Acetylcholinesterase inhibitors
Organophosphate insecticides
Fluorine compounds
Dimethylamino compounds